Mediator complex subunit 11 (Med11) is a protein that in humans is encoded by the MED11 gene.

Function 

Med11 is a component of the Mediator complex, which is a coactivator for DNA-binding factors that activate transcription via RNA polymerase II.

See also 
Mediator

References